Empress North 6 (Plains Midstream Canada) Aerodrome, formerly Empress/McNeill Spectra Energy Aerodrome , is located near Empress, Alberta, Canada.

See also
Empress Airport

References

External links
Page about this airport on COPA's Places to Fly airport directory

Registered aerodromes in Alberta
Cypress County